5/9 may refer to:
May 9 (month-day date notation)
September 5 (day-month date notation)